The Quezon Memorial Circle Museum may refer to one of the following museums within the Quezon Memorial Circle:

Museo ni Manuel L. Quezon, a museum hosted below the Quezon Memorial Shrine itself.
Quezon City Experience, an interactive museum.
Quezon Heritage House, a historic house museum.
Presidential Car Museum, a museum under construction dedicated to vehicles owned by past presidents of the Philippines.